Unnayi Warrier Smaraka Kalanilayam is a performing arts training institution in Irinjalakuda in Thrissur District of Kerala. The centre is affiliated with the Government of Kerala.

History
The institution was established in 1955 in memory of Unnayi Variyar, renowned writer of Nalacharitham. It is governed by a body of 12 persons elected from the general council consisting of 102 life members. Former prime minister of Cochin Panampilly Govinda Menon inaugurated the centre.

Courses and performances
The centre offers courses in Kathakali vesham, Kathakali music, Kathakali chenda, Kathakali maddalam, Kathakali , Koppupani (crafting of accessories & other costumes), Classical music, Violin, Bharathanatyam, Mohiniattam and Kuchipudi.

Public performances are conducted on Republic Day, Independence Day, the third Thursday of every month, 6 October, 12 July and Navarathri.

References

Kathakali
Mohiniyattam
Universities and colleges in Thrissur district
Performing arts education in India
Educational institutions established in 1955
1955 establishments in India
Arts and Science colleges in Kerala
Irinjalakuda